The Seventh Division  was part of the Army of the Republic of Vietnam (ARVN), the army of the nation state of South Vietnam that existed from 1955 to 1975. It was part of the IV Corps, which oversaw the Mekong Delta region of the country.

History
The Division was originally established as the 4th Field Division and redesignated as the 7th Infantry Division in 1959.

On 8 July 1959 a Viet Cong (VC) attack on a Division camp at Bien Hoa killed two U.S. advisers, Major Dale R. Buis and Master Sergeant Chester M. Ovnand, among the first Americans killed in the Vietnam War.

The Division was based in Mỹ Tho, and due to the division's close proximity to the capital Saigon was a key factor in the success or failure of the various coup attempts in the nation's history. As a result, the loyalty of the commanding officer of the division was crucial in maintaining power. In the coup attempt of 1960, the loyalist Colonel Huỳnh Văn Cao used the Division to storm into Saigon to save President Ngô Đình Diệm.

In 1962, Diem decided to split the command of the area in the south around Saigon into two, the former III Corps area being reduced in size to cover the area northeast of Saigon, and the newly created IV Corps taking over the west and southwest. Cao was promoted to general and assumed command of the new IV Corps Tactical Zone, which included the area of operations of his 7th Infantry Division. Command of the 7th was given to Cao's chief of staff, Colonel Bùi Đình Đạm.

The Division scored the biggest successes of the military campaigns of 1962, along with the Civil Guard and Self Defense Corps, killing more than 2,000 VC fighters and leaving thousands of others cut off from supplies. However, South Vietnamese officers were often reluctant to absorb heavy casualties. On several occasions, Cao's forces were in an excellent position to trap and wipe out whole battalions of VC, but he would fail to close the trap on one pretext or another and allow the enemy to escape. This behavior initially mystified the division's US adviser Lieutenant Colonel John Paul Vann, who directed much of the unit's activity, who was attempting to build Cao into an aggressive commander. Unknown to Vann, Diem would reprimand or demote any officer who lost too many men, no matter how successful the operation. Diem was more interested in using the military to protect his regime than to take on the VC. His solution was to fill the ARVN with Catholic political cronies and friends like Cao, Lê Quang Tung and Tôn Thất Đính, who had little military ability, but were very likely to help stop a coup attempt. After a skirmish on a highway that resulted in a small number of South Vietnamese casualties along with several trucks destroyed, Cao was called to Saigon and reprimanded by Diem. Upon his return, Vann and his group of advisers were forced to end the joint planning sessions that had been so successful earlier, and action essentially wound down in their region. Cao used the excellent military intelligence network they had developed to find areas devoid of VC, and planned operations only in those areas. In many other cases, operations were executed on paper only, in order to report an increasing tempo of operations that did not actually exist.

On 2 January 1963 the Division's 11th Regiment took part in the Battle of Ap Bac, a disastrous operation to trap a small VC force.

In  the successful coup of November 1963, the plotters managed to have the Division transferred temporarily to III Corps, with Diem unaware that III Corps commander Tôn Thất Đính was with the rebels. Đính then placed a rebel subordinate in command of the Seventh Division, preventing the rest of Cao's IV Corps from saving Diem.

By the end of 1965 the US advisers to the Division regarded Division commander Col. Nguyễn Viết Thanh as an aggressive commander who demanded "clear, correct and frank" reports from his subordinates and who had a "sound tactical sense of the war."

In 1967 Civil Operations and Revolutionary Development Support (CORDS) advisers found the Division's battalions charged with area security missions were more concerned with their own static defenses than with protecting nearby villages and hamlets or with chasing the local VC. Assessing General Thanh they found that "his personal cautiousness and reluctance to push the battalions [those in securing missions] into more offensive activities... difficult to understand," claiming that he discouraged the initiative and aggressiveness of his subordinates." CORDS chief Robert Komer agreed and in 1968 described Thanh as unaggressive, unimaginative, and "rather a xenophobe." All Komer's assistants noted worsening command and control problems at the lower tactical levels and a general confusion over the Division's roles and missions. Tactical advisers, they reported, claimed that the army units contributed little more than their "presence" to local security; were idle most of the time; and, when aroused, were content with "merely chasing the VC and showing the flag." Despite all the revolutionary development training, the regular troops were also back in the old "chicken-stealing business," foraging for food and living off the local peasantry."

From 12 September to 7 October 1967 the Division participated in Operation Coronado V with the US Mobile Riverine Force (MRF) against the VC 263rd Battalion in Định Tường and Kiến Hòa Provinces. The 7th Division lost 6 killed, while the VC lost 163 killed.

From 15–19 November 1967 the Division participated in Operation Kien Giang 9-1 with the ARVN 9th Division and the 5th Marine Battalion and the MRF against the VC 263rd Battalion's Base Area 470 in western Định Tường Province. The operation rendered the 263rd Battalion combat ineffective.

From 7 March to 7 August 1968 the Division participated in Operation Truong Cong Dinh with the MRF to reestablish South Vietnamese control over the northern Mekong Delta in the aftermath of the Tet Offensive. The operation killed 343 VC.

Following the withdrawal of the US 9th Infantry Division from South Vietnam in July 1969, MACV reported that the Division's performance had gone steadily downhill. At the time, five of its twelve infantry battalions were under the direct control of various Province chiefs, and most of the remainder were scattered about performing static security missions. As these troops hastily occupied the evacuated American facilities at Đồng Tâm Base Camp and elsewhere, they had little opportunity to familiarize themselves with the local enemy and terrain. Because of delays in the formation of new territorial units, the Corps' commander also continued to hold the Division responsible for its existing area security missions. Thus, despite additional aviation support and the rapid activation of 34 new RF companies, the Division was spread extremely thin, and its offensive capability dropped accordingly. President Nguyễn Văn Thiệu and III Corps commander General Thanh, tried to rectify the situation in January 1970 by sending Col. Nguyễn Khoa Nam, an Airborne brigade commander, to head the Division. Nam had earned a good military reputation in the airborne force and was credited with making remarkable progress with the Division. Fortunately for the South Vietnamese, PAVN/VC activity remained low in the Delta during late 1969 and 1970, as it did throughout South Vietnam, and the ineffectiveness of the Division had no immediate repercussions. US Corps-level advisers believed that its shortcomings could be easily remedied or, at least for the time being, balanced by the increasing mobility of the neighboring 9th Division, which General Thanh had withdrawn from its area security missions and began using it as the Corps' reaction force.

During 1971 the Division and territorial forces focused on destruction of PAVN and VC Base Base Area 470 on the boundary of Định Tường and Kien Phong Provinces.

During the Easter Offensive in southern Cambodia and the Mekong Delta the Division conducted operations against PAVN units in the Elephant's Foot area of Cambodia before returning the South Vietnam to counter PAVN/VC attempts to cut Route QL- which connected the Delta ricebowl to Saigon.

By the end of 1972, the Division, with headquarters at Đồng Tâm near My Tho, was responsible for Kien Phong, Kien Tuong, Định Tường and Go Cong Provinces. A major problem facing the Division was security in densely populated Định Tường Province which was the key to control of National Highway 4 (now National Highway 1A), the important line of communication leading to Saigon and it contained the major city of My Tho. It was also the focus of two major enemy infiltration corridors from Cambodia. One, Corridor 1A generally paralleled the boundary between Kien Phong and Kien Tuong Provinces into the key PAVN/VC base, the Tri Phap, at the junction of Kien Phong, Kien Tuong, and Dinh Tuong Provinces. The other, Corridor 1B, came out of Cambodia's Svay Rieng Province and entered Định Tường Province and the Tri Phap through the Plain of Reeds in Kien Tuong Province. Two enemy divisions opposed the Division. The PAVN 5th Division with three regiments: the 275th, the 174th and the E6, had fought in the Easter Offensive campaign in the Binh Long battles of April through June 1972, then moved to the Mekong Delta and campaigned in Kien Tuong, Kien Phong and Định Tường Provinces. The 6th Division was in central Dinh Tuong, its 24th Regiment was probably located east of My Tho close to the border of Go Cong Province; the 207th Regiment was in northern Kien Phong Province; and the 320th Regiment , which was probably operating as part of the 6th Division, was in southern Kien Phong. The Division, with an attached regiment of the 9th Division, had to cope with two independent regiments: the 88th and the DTI, controlled by VC Military Region 2. Although the Division had secured the vital line of communication to Saigon and the enemy's actions were limited to attacks by fire against outposts and populated areas, it had an imposing assignment.

By late 1973 the Division, under the command of Maj. Gen. Nguyễn Khoa Nam, had become particularly skillful in rapid deployment, netting significant catches along the infiltration corridors. As the year
drew to a close however, severe rationing of fuel, imposed to compensate for spiraling costs, drastically limited the Division's mobility. The permanent withdrawal of RF and PF from exposed positions balanced this disadvantage somewhat, in that General Nam less frequently had to dispatch troops in what were often futile but costly attempts to rescue besieged outposts; he could select areas of deployment more likely to result in combat with major units or large infiltrating groups. Employing advantages of surprise, superior mobility and firepower, including effective coordination with the RVNAF, the Division was usually the clear winner in that kind of encounter. At the end of the year the Division assumed responsibility for Vĩnh Long and Vĩnh Bình Provinces from the 9th Division and returned the 14th Regiment to the 9th Division.

From 12 February to 14 May 1974 the 12th Regiment and two battalions from the 10th Regiment together with units from the 9th Division participated in the Battle of Tri Phap attacking a PAVN base area in Định Tường Province before PAVN forces arrived there.

In April 1974 during the Battle of Svay Rieng the Division moved a forward command post into Mộc Hóa and was controlling the operation of two task forces then committed in the Elephant's Foot area of Cambodia. One was composed of the 15th Infantry, 9th Division and part of the 16th Armored Cavalry Squadron; the other included the 10th Infantry and elements of the 6th Armored Cavalry Squadron, in 12 days of fighting in the border area, these two mobile task forces killed 850 PAVN soldiers, captured 31, collected over 100 weapons, and suffered fewer than 300 casualties, including 39 killed.

On 9 April 1975 the PAVN 5th Division moved down from Svay Rieng Province into Long An Province attacking near Tân An with its 275th Regiment. The Long An territorials fought well and were reinforced from IV Corps by the 12th Regiment. Against light losses, the 2nd Battalion, 12th Regiment, killed over 100 soldiers of the 275th Regiment, forcing its commander to ask for reinforcement. The next day, the PAVN attacked the Can Dot airfield in Tân An and, after closing Highway 4, were driven off with heavy losses by Long An territorials. In two subsequent days of heavy fighting, the three Long An battalions, the 301st, 322nd and 330th, accounted for over 120 PAVN killed and 2 captured. Meanwhile, the 12th Regiment, fighting two regiments of the PAVN 5th Division, killed over 350 and captured 16.

During the final weeks of April VC units tried to interdict sections of Highway 4, but division forces repulsed these attacks. No attacks were launched on any district towns or provincial capitals in Dinh Tuong and other Mekong provinces. On 30 April 1975 as South Vietnamese President Duong Van Minh surrendered to the North Vietnamese, the division's units started to disintegrate, however in Cai Lay and My Tho, some units continued resistance until the morning of 1 May. Major General Nam and his deputy commander, Le Van Hung, committed suicide separately on 30 April and 1 May while Brigadier General Tran Van Hai committed suicide at Dong Tam Base on 30 April.

Organisation
Component units:
 10th Infantry Regiment
 11th Infantry Regiment
 12th Infantry Regiment
 70th, 71st, 72nd and 73rd Artillery Battalions
 6th Armored Cavalry Squadron
 US Advisory Team 75

References 

007